WomenTalk TV is a social enterprise founded by Eunice Olsen in August 2013 as a project of Olsen's House of Ou Studios. The series was nominated for an International Emmy Award in the Digital Program: Non-Fiction category in 2014, among numerous other awards and accolades.

WomenTalk TV publishes interviews featuring the accomplishments of everyday unsung women from all over Asia. WomenTalkTV has released nine videos in the first season. WomenTalk TV has since grown and introduced WomenTalk Pulse and WomenTalk Soul in 2016 to cover other aspects of women's empowerment.

History 
WomenTalkTV was created in 2013 by its host, Eunice Olsen, a former Nominated Member of Parliament (NMP) in Singapore as well as a television host and actress.

Format

WomenTalk TV 
WomenTalk TV interviews are hosted by Eunice. TV interviews focus on the particularly adversities faced by each of the women and how they have overcome them. All of the interviews also end with the women explaining what empowerment means to them. Each interview subject is able to nominate a charitable organisation to which viewers are encouraged to make donations. Viewers are then encouraged to upload their own videos documenting how they overcame personal struggles or that of other women they know.

WomenTalk Pulse 
WomenTalk Pulse interviews feature the women alone. Pulse interviews showcase the projects that the women have initiated. Each interview also shares a call-to-action the woman would like to involve viewers, whether through donations, volunteering, or awareness. Similar to a TV episode, each woman shares their definition of empowerment.

WomenTalk Soul 
Each WomenTalk Soul program and host focuses on a particular aspect of wellness: food and nutrition, exercise, happiness and wellness. Episodes are either conversational or hosted, each typically less than 2 minutes. WomenTalk Soul aims to be accessible for everyday women, whether they are mothers to children with special needs, working single ladies, or the elderly, introducing tips that cheap and easy to introduce into everyday lives, to allow viewers to achieve the full potential.

WomenTalk TV (Episodes by Season)

Season 1 
 Yip Pin Xiu
 Lena Sim
 Haslinah Yacob
 Sangduen Chailert
 Charm Tong
 Xilca Alvarez
 Cassandra Chiu
 Rachel Chung
 Doris Nuval

Season 2 
 Rebekah Choong
 Lai Yi Xuan
 Serena Tan
 Noeleen Heyzer
 Sola Long
 Carolyn Kan
 Joanna See Too
 Sam Lo
 Marini Ramlam

Season 3 
 Sharmilah Begum
 Penhleak Chan
 Theresa Goh
 Alvina Neo
 Aishah Samad
 Yap Qian Yin
 Anamika Subba
 Maya Bhattachan
 Kalyan Keo

Season 4 
 Anthea Ong
 Dolly Yeo
 Ruth Komathi
 Melissa Sarah Wee

WomenTalk Pulse (Episodes by Season)

Season 1 
 Priscilla Ong
 Rachel Lin
 Lim Xiang Lin
 Melissa Yeung Yap
 Poli Rai
 Lily Low
 Vanessa Ho
 Mary Soo
 June Chua

WomenTalk Soul (Episodes by Program)

What's That Sizzle

Mom's Recipes 
 Manomani's Recipe

Wellness Through Self 
 Rachel's Soul Tip
 A day in the life of: Anthea Ong
 Lily's Soul Tip
 Ruth's Soul Tip
 Melissa's Soul Tip
 Vanessa's Soul Tip

Awards and nominations
In 2014, Olsen was presented with a Great Women of Our Time award from Singapore Women's Weekly magazine.  That year WomenTalkTV was nominated for an International Digital Emmy Award in the non-fiction category. Since then, WomenTalk has received numerous award.
 2016 Best Shorts Competition: Humanitarian Award – Award of Distinction, Award of Excellence – Documentary Shorts, Award of Excellence – Women Filmmaker
 2016 Raindance Film Festival: Web Fest – Official Selection
 May 2016 Indie Fest Film Awards: Award of Merit – Documentary Short
 March 2016 Los Angeles Independent Film Festival Awards: Best Documentary Short
 March 2016 Hollywood International Moving Pictures Film Festival: Best Documentary Short, Best Women Filmmaker
 February 2016 Hollywood International Independent Documentary Award: Best Women Filmmaker
 42nd International Digital Emmy Award: Digital Non-Fiction – Nominated

References 

Singaporean documentary television series
Social enterprises